Geneva is a city in and the county seat of Kane County, Illinois, United States. It is located on the western side of the Chicago suburbs. Per the 2020 census, the population was 21,393.

Geneva is part of a tri-city area, located between St. Charles and Batavia. The area experienced rapid population growth from the late 1980s through the mid-2000s as the Chicago suburbs spread to the west.

Geneva is a popular tourist destination with its scenic location along the Fox River and numerous shops and restaurants.  There is an extensive bike trail system in Geneva including portions of the Fox River Trail and the Illinois Prairie Path. Geneva has an active historical society, the Geneva History Center, located in downtown Geneva as well as the Fabyan Windmill, an old Dutch windmill dating back to the 1850s.  In 2013 it was nominated by Bloomberg Businessweek as the best place to raise a kid in Illinois.

Geography
Geneva is located at 41°53'9" North, 88°18'42" West (41.885722, −88.311771),
 west of downtown Chicago.

History
Geneva was first settled in the 1830s on an important route from Chicago. Daniel Shaw Haight was the first European settler in Geneva. Haight sold his claim in 1835 to James and Charity Herrington, who were influential in the creation of the town of Geneva.  A local's connections with Col. Richard Hamilton, a prominent Cook County politician, led to the naming of Geneva as county seat in 1836. The town was platted a year later and was probably named after Geneva, New York. Before the name Geneva was chosen, the names LaFox, Big Spring, and Herrington's Ford were used. A courthouse and jail were among the first major works. Geneva was incorporated as a village in 1867. While its site as a county seat attracted attention, the village's location on the Fox River provided the most economic opportunities. Early goods manufactured in Geneva included cheese, butter, milled grains, and packed meat. The connection of the railroad in 1853 provided increased demand for industry, and by 1900, Appleton Manufacturing, Howell Foundry, Bennet Milling Co., and Pope Glucose Co. became major employers. This resulted in major civic improvement projects such as a pumping stations and water mains in 1896. Geneva was particularly noted for its flux of Swedish immigrants, who comprised half of the population by 1900. A year later, Geneva was connected to other Fox Valley communities through the Aurora, Elgin and Fox River Electric Company.

Historical sites

Fabyan Windmill

The Fabyan Windmill is an authentic, working Dutch windmill dating from the 1850s located in Geneva, just north of Batavia, off Route 25.

On June 4, 1979, the windmill was listed on the National Register of Historic Places as the Dutch Mill. The following year, the windmill was selected to be on a U.S. postage stamp, as part of a series of five windmills in a stamp booklet called "Windmills USA."  It originally operated as a custom grinding mill.

Riverbank Laboratories 

Riverbank Acoustical Laboratories is a NVLAP accredited acoustical testing agency founded by Wallace Clement Sabine in 1918. The acoustical laboratory building was funded and built by Colonel George Fabyan on his vast Riverbank Estate in Geneva, IL. In the facility's early days, It also housed a cryptology team that worked to decipher codes from the works of Sir Francis Bacon, Shakespeare, and enemy military communications. It was added to the National Register of Historic Places on November 28, 2003.

Fabyan Villa

The Fabyan Villa Museum houses photographs, the Fabyans' personal artifact collections, and a limited number of original furnishings, sharing the Riverbank story with the public.

Sacred Heart Seminary Shrine 
The Sacred Heart Seminary Shrine is a stone and mosaic religious Chapel located in Geneva. It sits next to the Kane County Government Center in the Gunnar Anderson Forest Preserve along the Fox River, near the old Sacred Heart Monastery. The shrine dates back to 1925 when a piece of the land along the river was sold to the Society of Jesus. The shrine is also known as the Geneva Grotto.

The beautiful mosaics on the sides of the shrine hold Latin writing saying Ignem veni mittere, which translates to "I have come to bring fire" as well as Ego sum lux mundi, meaning "I am the light of the world." The mosaics also house art work of three arches that depict heaven and earth, a crucifix crossed by two swords, as well as a lighthouse. The Latin phrases are references to the New Testament. Jesus uses the phrases to describe himself; as in embodying both beginning and end. The altar is inscribed with the letters "IHS," referencing the first three letters of Jesus in Greek.

The shrine has frequently been the victim of vandal, who have damaged part of the stone structure. On October 21, 2014, vandals threw white paint all over the stone walls and mosaics. They then proceeded to use spray paint to create symbols on the walls. Part of the stone structure was also damaged, leaving broken pieces of stone on the ground.

Elizabeth Place 

Elizabeth Place, or the Henry Bond Fargo House, is a historic residence in Geneva, in the Mission Revival style. The house was owned by Henry Bond Fargo, a prominent local businessmen who brought several early industries to Geneva. It was added to the National Register of Historic Places on May 12, 2008.

Sports
Geneva has been home to the Kane County Cougars since 1991 when the Wausau Timbers relocated from Wausau, Wisconsin. The Cougars currently play at Northwestern Medicine Field. Originally members of the Midwest League, in 2021 they will join the American Association of Professional Baseball. In 2015 the Chicago Steel of the United States Hockey League moved to Geneva from Bensenville, Illinois and play at Fox Valley Ice Arena.

Transportation

Geneva is served by Chicago Midway International Airport (MDW), Chicago O'Hare International Airport (ORD), and Dupage Airport (DPA).  The city also benefits from highways running through the city, including State Routes 25, 31, 38 with easy access to Interstate 88.

Bus
Geneva is also served by the Pace bus system run by Chicago's suburbs. The following bus routes run through this city:

 Route 529 - Randall Rd / 5th Street
 Route 801 - Elgin / Geneva
 Route 802 - Aurora / St. Charles

Train

Demographics

2020 census

Note: the US Census treats Hispanic/Latino as an ethnic category. This table excludes Latinos from the racial categories and assigns them to a separate category. Hispanics/Latinos can be of any race.

2010 Census
As of the 2010 United States Census there were 21,495 people, 7,865 households, and 5,927 families residing in the city.

The racial makeup of the city was 94.80% White, 0.5% African American, 0.1% Native American, 2.20% Asian, 1.20% from other races, and 1.3% from two or more races. Hispanic or Latino of any race were 4.90% of the population.

There were 8,278 households, out of which 37.3% had children under the age of 18 living with them, 63.8% were married couples living together, 8.6% had a female householder with no husband present, and 24.6% were non-families. 20.8% of all households were made up of individuals, and 7.8% had someone living alone who was 65 years of age or older.  The average household size was 2.72 and the average family size was 3.18.

In the city, the population was spread out, with 27% under the age of 18, 6.8% from 18 to 24, 21.9% from 25 to 44, 33% from 45 to 64, and 11.2% who were 65 years of age or older.  The median age was 42.4 years.  For every 100 females, there were 96.2 males.  For every 100 females age 18 and over, there were 93.0 males.

As of 2011 the median income for a household in the city was $93,588. Males had a median income of $65,103 versus $38,520 for females. The per capita income for the city was $42,995.  About 3.7% of families and 4.4% of the population were below the poverty line, including 4.5% of those under the age of 18 and 3.8% of those ages 65 and older.

2000 Census
As of the census of 2000, there were 19,515 people, 6,718 households, and 5,186 families residing in the city. The racial makeup of the city was 96.50% White, 1.02% African American, 0.06% Native American, 1.25% Asian, 0.03% Pacific Islander, 0.58% from other races, and 0.56% from two or more races. Hispanic or Latino of any race were 2.77% of the population.

There were 6,718 households, out of which 45.2% had children under the age of 18 living with them, 68.0% were married couples living together, 6.8% had a female householder with no husband present, and 22.8% were non-families. 19.2% of all households were made up of individuals, and 6.0% had someone living alone who was 65 years of age or older.  The average household size was 2.85 and the average family size was 3.31.

In the city, the population was spread out, with 31.8% under the age of 18, 5.3% from 18 to 24, 31.6% from 25 to 44, 22.4% from 45 to 64, and 8.9% who were 65 years of age or older.  The median age was 36 years.  For every 100 females, there were 99.9 males.  For every 100 females age 18 and over, there were 96.2 males.

As of 2011 the median income for a household in the city was $95,467. Males had a median income of $65,103 versus $38,520 for females. The per capita income for the city was $42,995.  About 1.6% of families and 2.2% of the population were below the poverty line, including 1.6% of those under the age of 18 and 4.9% of those ages 65 and older.

Education

Geneva School District 304 includes the following schools:

Elementary education schools
 Harrison Street Elementary School (built in 1929)
 Williamsburg Elementary School (built in 2008)
 Heartland Elementary School (built in 2002)
 Mill Creek Elementary School (built in 1996)
 Fabyan Elementary School (built in 2008)
 Western Avenue Elementary School (built in 1964)

Middle schools
 Geneva Middle School South (built in 1994)
 Geneva Middle School North (built in 2006)

High schools
 Geneva High School (built in 1958)

Annual events

Swedish Days
Geneva Arts Fair
Festival of the Vine
Christmas Walk
Geneva Concours d'Elegance

Media and entertainment
  Harry and Tonto (1974) starring Art Carney and directed by Paul Mazursky. Filmed outside of the Geneva Courthouse and the Geneva Motel.
 Road to Perdition (2002) starring Tom Hanks, Paul Newman, and Jude Law was filmed in downtown Geneva.
 Novocaine (2001) starring Steve Martin was filmed at the Geneva Motel on the East Side of Geneva.
 The Resurrection of Gavin Stone (2017) starring Brett Dalton was filmed in Geneva's downtown Dodson Place.
 The Christmas Thief (2021) starring Michelle Borth was filmed in downtown Geneva.

Notable people

Academia
 E. Philip Howrey, economist and professor
 Edmund Beecher Wilson, America's first cell biologist; discovered the chromosomal XY sex-determination system
Arts
 Gower Champion, theater director, choreographer, and dancer
 Diego Cortez, art curator
 Niykee Heaton, singer.
 Stu Linder, Academy Award-winning film editor (Grand Prix and Rain Man)
 Michael J. Nelson, head writer and star of cult TV show Mystery Science Theater 3000, and current leader of Rifftrax
 Joan Taylor, an Italian-American television and film actress
 Wolfgang Hoffmann, Austrian-American architect and designer active in American modernism; later a photographer
Business
 George Fabyan, (1867) wealthy cloth merchant and inventor of Riverbanks Laboratories
 Jervis Langdon, Jr., railroad executive and president of the Chicago, Rock Island and Pacific Railroad.
 John W. Scherer, founder and face of the software tutorial company Video Professor
 Dale Shewalter, founder and promoter of the Arizona Trail; born in Geneva
Media

 Sam Smith, sportswriter
 Bob Woodward, author and investigative reporter (Washington Post)
Politics
 Steven Andersson (born 1964), member of the Illinois House of Representatives from 2015 to 2019. He is a resident of Geneva.
 James Graham Fair (1831–1894), U.S. Senator from Nevada and wealthy mine operator known as the Bonanza King. He was a childhood resident of Geneva.
 S. Louis Rathje, Illinois Supreme Court justice
 Dan Ugaste, member of the Illinois House of Representatives since 2019. He is a resident of Geneva.
 Wayne Wallingford (born 1946), member of the Missouri House of Representatives since 2021. Wallingford was born and raised in Geneva.
Sports
 Varney Anderson, pitcher with the Indianapolis Hoosiers and Washington Senators
 Sid Bennett, offensive tackle with the Chicago Tigers and Milwaukee Badgers
 Ben Kanute, Olympic triathlete
Kevin McDowell, Olympic triathlete
 Gabrielle Perea, artistic gymnast
 Duncan Turnbull, goalkeeper for the Las Vegas Lights FC
 Bob Zeman, defensive back with the San Diego Chargers

Other
 Elizebeth Smith Friedman, author and cryptologist

Sister cities
Croissy-sur-Seine (Western Suburb of Paris, France)

References

External links

 City of Geneva official website
 Geneva Chamber of Commerce
 Geneva Public Library District
 Geneva History Center
 Geneva Community Unit, School District 304

 
Cities in Illinois
County seats in Illinois
Chicago metropolitan area
Cities in Kane County, Illinois
Populated places established in 1887
1887 establishments in Illinois